Lyndell Santrell "Mack" Wilson (born February 14, 1998) is an American football linebacker for the New England Patriots of the National Football League (NFL). He played college football at Alabama.

Early years
Wilson attended George Washington Carver High School in Montgomery, Alabama. A five star recruit, he committed to University of Alabama to play college football.

College career
Wilson played in all 15 games as a true freshman at Alabama in 2016, recording eight tackles. As a sophomore in 2017, he played in 12 games with two starts and had 40 tackles and four interceptions and one touchdown. As a junior in 2018, Wilson had 71 tackles, one sack, and two interceptions. After the season, Wilson decided to forgo his senior year and enter the 2019 NFL Draft.

College statistics

Professional career

Cleveland Browns
Wilson was drafted by the Cleveland Browns in the fifth round (155th overall) in the 2019 NFL Draft.
In week 9 against the Denver Broncos, Wilson recorded a team high five tackles and made his first career sack on Brandon Allen in the 24-19 loss.
In week 15 against the Arizona Cardinals, Wilson recorded his first career interception off a pass thrown by fellow rookie Kyler Murray during the 38–24 loss. As a rookie, Wilson appeared in all 16 games, and started 14 of them. He finished with one sack, 82 total tackles, one interception, seven passes defended, and one forced fumble.

In the 2020 season, Wilson finished with 39 total tackles and two passes defended in 13 games, of which he started eight. In the 2021 season, Wilson finished with 42 total tackles in 14 games, of which he started six.

New England Patriots
On March 16, 2022, Wilson was traded to the New England Patriots in exchange for Chase Winovich. In the 2022 season, he appeared in all 17 games, of which he started three. He finished with 1.5 sacks, 36 total tackles, one pass defended, and one forced fumble.

NFL career statistics

Regular season

References

External links
  
 Collegiate statistics at Sports-Reference.com
 New England Patriots bio
 Alabama Crimson Tide bio
 

1998 births
Living people
Players of American football from Montgomery, Alabama
American football linebackers
Alabama Crimson Tide football players
Cleveland Browns players
New England Patriots players